Osteopelta is a genus of sea snails, marine gastropod mollusks in the family Osteopeltidae.

Species
Species within the genus Osteopelta include:
 Osteopelta ceticola Warén, 1989
 Osteopelta huanyingae J. He, Z.-X. Qian & Y. Fang, 2017
 Osteopelta mirabilis Marshall, 1987
 Osteopelta praeceps B.A. Marshall, 1994

References

External links
 Marshall, B. A. (1987). Osteopeltidae (Mollusca:Gastropoda): A new family of limpets associated with whalebone in the deep-sea. Journal of Molluscan Studies. 53 (2): 121-127.

Osteopeltidae